This is a list of Jesuit educational institutions in the Philippines.

Tertiary institutions

Basic Education institutions

Defunct institutions

Distribution map

Gallery

See also
 List of Jesuit educational institutions
 List of Jesuit sites

Notes

External links
www.phJesuits.org – The Official Website of the Philippine Province of the Society of Jesus

 List